Kazakhstan has submitted fourteen films in the Academy Award for Best International Feature Film category since gaining its independence from the USSR in 1991. In 2008, Kazakhstan received its first-ever Oscar nomination, for the epic Genghis Khan biography, Mongol. Kazakhstan shocked many Oscar prognosticators when the obscure Kelin was shortlisted in 2010 over better-known films for Italy, Korea, Norway and others. Ultimately, Kelin failed to reach the final five. Kazakhstan is so far the only Central Asian country to be nominated for an Academy Award.

Submissions
The Academy of Motion Picture Arts and Sciences has invited the film industries of various countries to submit their best film for the Academy Award for Best Foreign Language Film since 1956. Below is a list of the films that have been submitted by Kazakhstan for review by the Academy for the award by year and the respective Academy Awards ceremony.

Kazakhstan's first three submissions were epic historical dramas, showcasing key moments in pre-Soviet Central Asian history. The Fall of Otrar and Mongol take place in the 13th century, while Nomad is set in the 17th century.

The Fall of Otrar was produced by Kazakhfilm studio while Kazakhstan was still a part of the Soviet Union. Kazakhstan gained its independence in December 1991 and submitted the film in Fall 1992 to compete for the 1993 Academy Awards. The film is a violent 3-hour drama, shot mostly in black and white with occasional bursts of color, about political intrigue in the city of Otrar immediately before Genghis Khan's invasion.

Although the Kazakh film industry continued to produce a number of small, independent films that achieved success at international film festivals (including The Killer, Shiza and Little Men), Kazakhstan did not submit any other films for consideration until 14 years later.

Kazakhstan rejoined the Oscar race in 2006 and 2007 with two new, big-budget action movies, (Nomad and Mongol) both directed by Sergei Bodrov, an ethnic Russian and dual-citizen of both Russia and Kazakhstan.

Nomad, the most expensive film ever made in Kazakhstan, was bankrolled by the Kazakh government and told the story of the young Ablai Khan, who would eventually unite a number of Kazakh tribes on the steppes of 18th century Kazakhstan. Bodrov replaced French director Ivan Passer as director of Nomad early in filming.

Mongol was a lavish biography of the famed Mongolian leader Genghis Khan, from his childhood as a slave until the beginning of his conquest of much of the known world. In January 2008, AMPAS announced that Mongol had been selected from among 63 films as one of the five nominees for Best Foreign Language Film of the year. It eventually lost to Austria's The Counterfeiters.

Both of Bodrov's films were international co-productions featuring multi-national casts dubbed into Kazakh and Mongolian respectively. The lead actor in Nomad was American actor Jay Hernandez, while other supporting cast members came from Kazakhstan, Mexico and the USA. The lead actor in Mongol was Japanese actor Tadanobu Asano, while most of the supporting cast hailed from China and Mongolia.

In Fall 2008, Kazakhstan chose a non-action film for the first time. Comedy Tulpan tells the story of a young Kazakh sailor who returns home to landlocked Kazakhstan to search for a bride after serving in the military in Russia and begins trying to woo the only single girl in the entire region. Tulpan won the Un Certain Regard Prize at the Cannes Film Festival, and Best Feature Film at the Asia Pacific Screen Awards, as well as major awards at film festivals in Karlovy Vary and Tokyo.

In Fall 2009, Kelin, an obscure costume drama about a girl forced into an arranged marriage, and made with no dialogue, was selected over much-favored Gift to Stalin. It impressed the Oscar committee so much that it made the nine-film Oscar shortlist announced in January 2010.

Nomad, Mongol and Tulpan were released theatrically in a number of Western countries, including the United States in 2007, 2008 and 2009 respectively, as well as throughout the former USSR, and all are available on DVD with English subtitles.  Kelin is available on DVD in Kazakhstan.

1997 Academy Award nominee Prisoner of the Mountains from Russia (and also directed by Sergei Bodrov) was a Kazakh co-production and the 1974 Soviet submission, The Ferocious One was co-produced by a Kazakh film studio.

See also
List of Soviet submissions for the Academy Award for Best International Feature Film

Notes

References

Best Foreign Language Film Academy Award submissions by country
Academy Award for Best Foreign Language Film
Lists of films by country of production
Academy Award